Brogers Creek is a locality in the Illawarra region of New South Wales, Australia.

References 

City of Shoalhaven
Municipality of Kiama
Towns in New South Wales